Gaël Monfils was the defending champion, but lost in the second round to Yuki Bhambri.

Alexander Zverev won the title, defeating Kevin Anderson in the final, 6–4, 6–4.

Seeds
All seeds received a bye into the second round.

Draw

Finals

Top half

Section 1

Section 2

Bottom half

Section 3

Section 4

Qualifying
The top two seeds receive a bye into the qualifying competition.

Seeds

Qualifiers

Lucky loser
  Marc Polmans

Qualifying draw

First qualifier

Second qualifier

Third qualifier

Fourth qualifier

Fifth qualifier

Sixth qualifier

References
Main draw
Qualifying draw

2017 ATP World Tour